Franklin Edgerton (July 24, 1885 – December 7, 1963) was an American linguistic scholar. He was Salisbury Professor of Sanskrit and Comparative Philology at Yale University (1926) and visiting professor at Benares Hindu University (1953–4). Between 1913 and 1926, he was the Professor of Sanskrit at the University of Pennsylvania. He is well known for his exceptionally literal translation of the Bhagavad Gita which was published as volume 38-39 of the Harvard Oriental Series in 1944. He also edited the parallel edition of four recensions of the Simhāsana Dvātrṃśika ("32 Tales of the Throne", also known as Vikrama Charita: "Adventures of Vikrama"), and a reconstruction of the (lost) original Sanskrit text of the Panchatantra.

Publications
 Edgerton, Franklin (1924). Panchatantra reconstructed. 2 Volumes. New Haven, CT: American Oriental Society. , 
 Edgerton, Franklin (1926). Vikrama's Adventures. Harvard Oriental Series, Volumes 26 & 27. Cambridge, MA: Harvard University Press. , 
 Edgerton, Franklin (1931) The elephant-lore of the Hindus. Yale University Press.
Edgerton, Franklin (1944) The Bhagavad Gita, Translated and interpreted from the Sanskrit,  Harvard University Press: Cambridge, Mass. 
 Edgerton, Franklin (1953). Buddhist hybrid sanskrit grammar and dictionary, Vol. 1: Grammar. New Haven: Yale University Press
 Edgerton, Franklin (1953). Buddhist hybrid sanskrit grammar and dictionary, Vol. 2: Dictionary. New Haven: Yale University Press
 Edgerton, Franklin (1965). The Beginnings of Indian Philosophy: Selections from the Rig Veda, Atharva Veda, Upanisads, and Mahabharata, Translated from the Sanskrit with an Introduction, notes, and glossarial index. Harvard University Press & George Allen & Unwin London

References

External links
Franklin Edgerton at Google Scholar
Franklin Edgerton at Google Books
 Franklin Edgerton Papers (MS 1720). Manuscripts and Archives, Yale University Library.

1885 births
1963 deaths
Linguists from the United States
Translators to Sanskrit
Translators of the Bhagavad Gita
Linguistic Society of America presidents
20th-century translators
American Sanskrit scholars
Yale University faculty
University of Pennsylvania faculty
20th-century linguists